Vice Admiral William J. Galinis (born c. 1961) is an active duty United States Navy officer and career surface warfare officer who has been serving as the 45th Commander of Naval Sea Systems Command since June 2020.

Early life and education 
Galinis is a native of Delray Beach, Florida. He is a 1983 graduate of the U.S. Naval Academy where he received a Bachelor of Science degree in Electrical Engineering. He holds a Master of Science degree in Electrical Engineering from the Naval Postgraduate School.

Military career 
Galinis’ sea duty assignments included Engineer Officer on board  and Damage Control Assistant on board .

Galinis’ command assignments include LPD 17 Program Manager; Supervisor of Shipbuilding, Gulf Coast; and as the Commanding Officer of the Norfolk Ship Support Activity (NSSA).

Galinis’ flag assignments include Commander, Navy Regional Maintenance Center, during which time he also assumed the duties of Deputy Commander for Surface Warfare, Naval Sea Systems Command; and most recently as Program Executive Officer, Ships.

Vice Admiral Galinis assumed command as the 45th Commander of Naval Sea Systems Command (NAVSEA) in June 2020.

References

1960s births
Year of birth uncertain
Living people
United States Navy officers
United States Navy admirals
United States Naval Academy alumni
Naval Postgraduate School alumni